Adlington may refer to:

People
Adlington (surname)

Places
Adlington, Cheshire
Adlington, Lancashire
Adlington Hall, a country house in Cheshire, England
Adlington Hall, Lancashire, a country house in Lancashire, England

See also
Aldington (disambiguation)